Hydrangea gracilis is a species of flowering plant in the family Hydrangeaceae, native to China. It was formally described by W.T. Wang and M.X. Nie in 1981.

External links
 Hydrangea gracilis at www.efloras.org.

gracilis
Flora of China